The 35th General Assembly of Prince Edward Island was in session from February 8, 1904, to October 15, 1908. The Liberal Party led by Arthur Peters formed the government. On February 1, 1908, Francis Haszard became Liberal party leader and Premier after Peters died in office.

There were four sessions of the 35th General Assembly:

Albert E. Douglas was elected speaker.

Members

Kings

Prince

Queens

Notes:

External links
  Election results for the Prince Edward Island Legislative Assembly, 1904-12-07
 Canadian Parliamentary Guide, 1912, EJ Chambers

Terms of the General Assembly of Prince Edward Island
1904 establishments in Prince Edward Island
1908 disestablishments in Prince Edward Island